Eucalyptus captiosa is a species of mallee that is endemic to the south-west of Western Australia. It has smooth bark, lance-shaped adult leaves, groups of three or seven, slightly ribbed flower buds arranged in leaf axils, pale yellow flowers and  cup shaped fruit.

Description
Flowering mainly occurs from July to November and the flowers are cream-coloured to pale yellow.

Taxonomy and naming
Eucalyptus captiosa was first formally described in 1993 by Ian Brooker and Stephen Hopper and the description was published in the journal Nuytsia from a specimen near Jerramungup. The specific epithet (captiosa) is a word Latin meaning "deceptive", referring to the fine leaves, which are very different from those of the related E. incrassata.

Distribution and habitat
This eucalypt grow in sandy and gravelly soils in heath between Tambellup and Jerramungup in the Avon Wheatbelt, Esperance Plains and Mallee biogeographic regions.

Conservation status
Eucalyptus captiosa is classified as "not threatened" by the Western Australian Government Department of Parks and Wildlife.

See also
List of Eucalyptus species

References

Eucalypts of Western Australia
Trees of Australia
captiosa
Myrtales of Australia
Plants described in 1993
Taxa named by Ian Brooker
Taxa named by Stephen Hopper